Sabou is a town in the Sabou Department of Boulkiemdé Province in central western Burkina Faso. It is the capital of the Sabou Department and has a population of 15,060.

References

Populated places in Boulkiemdé Province